Carole Frances Lung (born 1966) is an American artist and labor activist, known for her performance art which centers around subjects such as textile consumption, unfair labor practices, and production systems. Lung is an associate professor of Fashion Fiber and Materials at California State University, Los Angeles. Her work concerns labor in the fashion industry and often comprises long-duration projects of performance art and collaborative art activism. She is based in Long Beach, California.

Early life and education 
Carole Frances Lung was born in 1966 in San Francisco, California. She was raised in Huntington Beach.

Lung received a Bachelor of Science degree in Textiles and Clothing from North Dakota State University in 1988. She moved to New York City to work in the fashion design industry. Lung studied Fiber and Material Studies at the School of the Art Institute of Chicago, receiving a BFA degree in 2005 and a MFA degree in 2007. During a 2006 semester abroad in Weimar, Germany, she studied Public Art and New Artistic Strategies at the Bauhaus University. There she engaged in her performance piece "One Size Fits All," sewing out of a storefront.

Career and Works 
Carole Frances Lung has almost fifteen years of experience working in the garment industry. She uses her art as a form of activism which makes statements on various topics, such as mass production and consumption, and the value of thoughtfully made clothing.

Lung's project Sewing Rebellion has as its goal to break the mass-production cycle of consumer textiles, and involves teaching participants to make and repair clothing. Her project Made in Haiti (2009-2012) was a collaboration with Haitian tailors to create an alternative to the mass globalized textile market.

Lung has also created performance art under the persona "Frau Fiber," an East German garment worker. Frau Fiber was born in Apolda, Germany in 1966 and worked in garment and machine knitting factories until the fall of the Berlin Wall. Frau Fiber takes inspiration from the folk character John Henry; knitting or sewing by hand against faster technology, knowing that ultimately she will fail. Lung's performances as Frau Fiber take different forms: she might do alterations on visitors' clothings, as she did in Santa Monica in 2017, or teach others to knock off fashions produced for H&M, as she did in 2015, or sewing a collaborative quilt, as she did in Greensboro, South Carolina, in 2010.

Carole also owns a warehouse in San Pedro, California that she has named The Loft. Here she runs Frau Fiber’s Institute for Labor Genorosity Workers and Uniforms. She utilizes this space for both her headquarters and as place to hold workshops, such as the Sewing Rebellion and Kaffee und Kuchen, where she has invited people for coffee and cake to have a conversation through Zoom or walk-up.

Recently, she has used The Loft to go in to lockdown in March 2020, where she made a mask a day to show solidarity of COVID-19. Three hundred masks were made over this period of time and were donated to homeless shelters. Production of these masks went all the way until March 2021.

Awards 
At the Edge Gallery 400

Craft Creativity and Design Center Grant

CSULA Creative Leave (2014)

Creative Mini Grant (2014)

Kohler Arts and Industry Residency

Fred A. Hillbruner Artist Book Fellowship

Faculty Fellow for the Public Good

Louis Comfort Tiffany (nominee)

References 

1966 births
Living people
American women artists
School of the Art Institute of Chicago alumni
American performance artists
People from Huntington Beach, California
California State University, Los Angeles faculty
21st-century American women